Mordehai "Moti" Milgrom is an Israeli physicist and professor in the department of Particle Physics and Astrophysics at the Weizmann Institute in Rehovot, Israel.

Biography
He received his B.Sc. degree from the Hebrew University of Jerusalem in 1966. Later he studied at the Weizmann Institute of Science and completed his doctorate in 1972.Before 1980 he worked primarily on high-energy astrophysics and became well-known for his kinematical model of the star system SS 433. In the academic years 1980–1981 and 1985–1986 he was at the Institute for Advanced Study in Princeton.  In 1981, he proposed Modified Newtonian dynamics (MOND) as an alternative to the dark matter and galaxy rotation curve problems.

Milgrom and Modified Newtonian dynamics
Milgrom suggests that Newton's Second Law be modified for very small accelerations, typically of the order of 10-9g and less.

Recent findings
In 2022, a study about an astronomical observation of the tidal tails in five star clusters was published that might provide evidence of MOND. Specifically, there is an uneven distribution of stars that shows no indication that any dark matter was involved in causing it.

Personal life
Milgrom is married and has three daughters.

See also
 Cosmic rays
 Gamma-ray burst
 Gamma ray and x-ray sources.

References

Further reading

External links

MOND - A Pedagogical Review - M. Milgrom, 2001
M. Milgrom @ Astrophysics Data System

1946 births
Living people
Israeli physicists
Israeli astrophysicists
Hebrew University of Jerusalem alumni
Weizmann Institute of Science alumni
Academic staff of Weizmann Institute of Science
Institute for Advanced Study visiting scholars
Jewish physicists
Cosmic ray physicists